Bio-Hazard Battle, released in Japan as , is a 1992 scrolling shooter released for the Sega Mega Drive/Genesis and for the Sega Mega Play arcade platform. On February 26, 2007, it was made available on the Wii's Virtual Console. The game was also re-released on the Steam platform on October 26, 2010. An unreleased X68000 version exists currently under ownership of M2 CEO Naoki Horii.

Plot
During the first global biowar on the planet Avaron, a retrovirus was released as a deadly reprisal from the enemy. The viruses unleashed biological forces which couldn't be stopped, leaving the planet filled with new and deadly forms of life.

Only a few survivors remain in suspended animation in O.P. Odysseus, an orbiting platform circling Avaron. The space station's purpose is to keep the surviving humans alive until Avaron is habitable again. The crew of the Odysseus, along with four organic ships known as the "Biowarriors", have been frozen in cryogenic tanks for hundreds of years, and now the onboard computer has awakened them.

Computer probes show that conditions on Avaron are hostile, but livable. The question is; where can the crew of Odysseus set up a colony? The Biowarriors are sent to Avaron to scout areas which the probes have designated least hostile, ascertaining planetary conditions and, ultimately finding a new home for the remaining survivors. The game ends showing all four characters flying back into the mothership.

Gameplay
The game is a 2D horizontally scrolling shooter. The character chosen by the player can be moved in 8 directions by the D-Pad. The player can move, shoot, dodge, and block. To block an enemy projectile, the player must place the Power Star in the path of the projectile. There is also an array of different weapons at the ships' disposal. Four different craft are available and each has different weapons. Their flight speeds also vary.

The player begins with a pre-set number of lives, from 1 to 5, 3 being the default. When a player is hit by a hostile creature or environment, their ship is destroyed and will reappear with one less life. Extra lives are attainable by absorbing 1-UP icons in the various stages, or reaching milestones for accumulating points without getting Game Over. 20,000, 50,000 and 100,000 points are the first three.

The game also features strong usage of deep, bass-heavy music tracks, creative and colorful artwork and foreground and background elements. Despite the many obstacles in the scenery and landscape, the player cannot be harmed or die by bumping into anything other than an enemy or enemy fire. Players can, however, die by being crushed between the screen's edge and a wall. Scrolling and enemy movement is extremely fast in comparison to other games of its time. The player travels through eight levels, each one increasing in difficulty, with the last three only being available on the higher difficulties.

Reception

References 

1992 video games
Arcade video games
Bioterrorism in fiction
Cancelled X68000 games
Post-apocalyptic video games
Sega Genesis games
Sega video games
Horizontally scrolling shooters
Virtual Console games
Windows games
Cooperative video games
Science fiction video games
Video games about viral outbreaks
Video games set in the future
Video games developed in Japan